The River Valency is a short river in north Cornwall, England, UK, with many small tributaries. After running past Lesnewth it cuts a valley before entering the sea at the harbour of the village of Boscastle.

The Valency valley is steep-sided and the sides of the lower section are wooded. The valley has been flooded many times, most seriously in the Boscastle flood of 2004 when significant channel erosion occurred. (Heavy rainfall for 7 hours over a wide area in the afternoon of 16 August 2004 led to severe flooding and structural damage.)  The agricultural use and fast drainage within the catchment areas of the Valency and Jordan are related to the extent of the Boscastle flooding.

Etymology
The name has been explained as a corruption of the Cornish Melinjy (i.e. Melin-Chy = Mill-house) from the mill which existed in medieval times.

References

Valency
Boscastle